The Namibia Premier League (NPL), also known as Debmarine Namibia Premiership  is the highest level of domestic association football in Namibia. The league was established in 1990 and was trimmed to 12 teams from the traditional 16 in 2005. It was folded in 2020 after ongoing problems with the Namibia Football Association, which finally ended the relationship. Meanwhile, the NFA founded the Namibia Football Premier League. The league restarted on the 6th November for the 2022/2023 season with African Starts against Unam at Hage Geingob Rugby Stadium

2017/18 Namibia Premier League clubs
African Stars (Windhoek)
Black Africa (Windhoek)
Blue Waters (Walvis Bay)
Chief Santos (Tsumeb)
Citizens (Windhoek)
Civics (Windhoek)
Eleven Arrows (Walvis Bay)
Life Fighters (Otjiwarongo)
Mighty Gunners (Otjiwarongo)
Orlando Pirates (Windhoek)
Rundu Chiefs (Rundu)
Tigers (Windhoek)
Tura Magic (Windhoek)
UNAM (Windhoek)
Young Africans (Gobabis)
Young Chiefs (Oshakati)

Previous champions
1990 : Orlando Pirates (Windhoek)
1991 : Eleven Arrows (Walvis Bay)
1992 : Ramblers (Windhoek)
1993 : Chief Santos (Tsumeb)
1994 : African Stars (Windhoek) 
1995 : Black Africa (Windhoek)
1996 : Blue Waters (Walvis Bay)
1997 : not contested
1998 : Black Africa (Windhoek)
1999 : Black Africa (Windhoek)
2000 : Blue Waters (Walvis Bay)
2001–02 : Liverpool (Okahandja)
2002–03 : Chief Santos (Tsumeb)
2003–04 : Blue Waters (Walvis Bay)
2004–05 : FC Civics (Windhoek)
2005–06 : FC Civics (Windhoek)
2006–07 : FC Civics (Windhoek)
2007–08 : Orlando Pirates (Windhoek)
2008–09 : African Stars (Windhoek)
2009–10 : African Stars (Windhoek)
2010–11 : Black Africa (Windhoek)
2011–12 : Black Africa (Windhoek)
2012–13 : Black Africa (Windhoek)
2013–14 : Black Africa (Windhoek)
2014–15 : African Stars (Windhoek)
2015–16: Tigers (Windhoek)
2016–17 : Not played
2017–18: African Stars (Windhoek)
2018–19: Black Africa (Windhoek)
2019–20 : Not played

Most titles

Topscorers

See also
NFA-Cup

References

External links
 League at fifa.com
 RSSSF competition history

 
Football leagues in Namibia
Namibia
1990 establishments in Namibia
2020 disestablishments in Namibia
Sports leagues established in 1990
Sports leagues disestablished in 2020